Conor Michael Grant (born 23 July 2001) is an Irish professional footballer who plays as a midfielder for EFL League One club Milton Keynes Dons.

Club career

Sheffield Wednesday

At youth level, Grant played for Irish clubs Malahide United and Shamrock Rovers before joining the academy of EFL Championship club Sheffield Wednesday in May 2017. He signed professional terms in December 2018. On 15 September 2020, Grant made his professional debut coming on as an 89th-minute substitute in a 2–0 EFL Cup second round win over Rochdale.

Rochdale
On 1 February 2021, Grant signed a two-and-a-half year contract with EFL League One club Rochdale for an undisclosed fee. He made his debut five days later as a 68th-minute substitute in a 2–0 defeat away to Charlton Athletic on 6 February 2021. On 13 April 2021, Grant scored his first senior professional goal in a 2–1 home win over Swindon Town.

Milton Keynes Dons
On 24 June 2022, Grant joined EFL League One club Milton Keynes Dons for an undisclosed fee, signing a "long term" contract. He made his debut on the opening day of the season in a 1–0 defeat away to Cambridge United. Grant scored his first goal for the club on 9 August 2022 in a 1–0 EFL Cup first round home win over Sutton United.

Career statistics

References

2001 births
Living people
English footballers
Association football midfielders
English Football League players
Sheffield Wednesday F.C. players
Rochdale A.F.C. players
Milton Keynes Dons F.C. players
Republic of Ireland association footballers